Kitty C. Calavita is an American criminologist, focusing in sociology of law, criminology, immigration, criminal justice and inequality, currently the Chancellor's Professor Emerita at University of California, Irvine and an Elected Fellow of the American Political and Social Science Society.

References

Year of birth missing (living people)
Living people
University of California, Irvine faculty
American criminologists
American women criminologists
University of Delaware alumni